Ultimate Care II is the tenth studio album by experimental electronic music by Matmos, released on February 19, 2016 on Thrill Jockey.

Production
Ultimate Care II consists entirely of sounds produced by the musicians' Whirlpool Ultimate Care II washing machine, recorded in their basement. It features guest contributors Dan Deacon, Jason Willett from Half Japanese, Max Eilbacher and Sam Haberman from Horse Lords, and Duncan Moore from Needle Gun. The album consists of one 38-minute-long track, described in a press release as depicting "an exploded view of the machine, hearing it in normal operation, but also as an object being rubbed and stroked and drummed upon and prodded and sampled and sequenced and processed by the duo”.

Reception
Upon release, "Ultimate Care II" received "Generally Favourable Reviews" from mainstream music critics. It was given a score of 76 by Metacritic.

Accolades

Track listing

References

Further reading 

 
 

2016 albums
Matmos albums
Thrill Jockey albums
Electroacoustic music albums
Musique concrète albums
Sound collage albums